Rufus Wainwright and Amsterdam Sinfonietta Live is a live album by Rufus Wainwright and the Amsterdam Sinfonietta, released via BMG/Modern Recordings on November 26, 2021.

Release and promotion
The album was originally scheduled for release on April 24, 2021, but delayed by disruptions to physical product distribution attributed to the COVID-19 pandemic.

A promotional single, "Gay Messiah", was released ahead of the album. The studio version of "Gay Messiah" was included on Wainwright's 2004 album Want Two, after premiering on the 2004 EP Waiting for a Want.

Track listing

References

2021 live albums
BMG Rights Management albums
Rufus Wainwright albums